Robinson Stévenin (born 1 March 1981) is a French actor.

Personal life 
Robinson's father is the actor Jean-François Stévenin. Also in the acting profession are his brother Sagamore Stévenin, Pierre Stévenin and his sister Salomé Stévenin.

Filmography

External links 
 

1981 births
Living people
Most Promising Actor César Award winners
French male film actors
French male television actors
20th-century French male actors
21st-century French male actors
People from Lons-le-Saunier